The Gwinnett Historic Courthouse is an historic government building located at 185 West Crogan Street in Lawrenceville in Gwinnett County, Georgia. The original county courthouse burned in 1872. The present day Courthouse was built in 1885. It served as the center of county business for over a century. As the population of the county grew, the Courthouse could no longer handle all of the county's business. In 1988, Gwinnett County moved the majority of its operations into the new Justice and Administration Building located at 75 Langley Drive in Lawrenceville. The old Courthouse underwent a lengthy three year renovation starting in 1989. It reopened on July 3, 1992, as the Gwinnett Historic Courthouse. Today, it serves as a rental venue for weddings, concerts, conferences, and other special events. It is one of the parks maintained by the Gwinnett County Parks and Recreation Department.

On September 18, 1980, it was added to the National Register of Historic Places.

In 1993, a statue commemorating the Confederate States was erected outside the courthouse with an inscription of "1861–1865 Lest We Forget". The statue stood until February 2021, when it was removed and placed in storage as part of the removal of Confederate monuments and memorials that occurred in the months following the George Floyd protests. The Gwinnett County Board of Commissioners approved the change, saying the monument was not consistent with the modern values of the county.

See also
Gwinnett County, Georgia
Lawrenceville, Georgia

References

External links 

Courthouses on the National Register of Historic Places in Georgia (U.S. state)
Buildings and structures in Gwinnett County, Georgia
County courthouses in Georgia (U.S. state)
National Register of Historic Places in Gwinnett County, Georgia